The 1993 World Table Tennis Championships – Swaythling Cup (men's team) was the 42nd edition of the men's team championship.  

Sweden won the gold medal defeating China 3–1 in the final. Germany won the bronze medal defeating the North Korea 3–0 in the bronze medal play off.

Medalists

Final Stage knockout phase

Quarter finals

Semifinals

Third-place playoff

Final

See also
List of World Table Tennis Championships medalists

References

-